Daniel Davis (born November 26, 1945) is an American film, stage and television actor.

Davis is best known for portraying Niles the butler on the sitcom The Nanny (1993 to 1999), and for his two guest appearances as Professor Moriarty on Star Trek: The Next Generation, affecting an upper class English accent for both roles. He voices the intelligent Cro-Magnon, Longhair, from the Longhair and Doubledome cartoon shorts from Cartoon Network's Big Pick.

Early life and education
Davis was born in Gurdon, Arkansas, and grew up in Little Rock. His parents operated a cinema. His first acting job was at the age of 11, when he was cast in a local broadcast program, Betty's Little Rascals.

Davis graduated from Hall High School in Little Rock in 1963. He graduated from the Arkansas Arts Center with a Bachelor of Fine Arts, followed by work with the Oregon Shakespeare Festival, the Stratford Shakespeare Festival, and six years with the American Conservatory Theater (ACT). During his time at ACT, he taught acting classes.

Career

Television and film
Davis first became popular in daytime television playing opposite Beverlee McKinsey as her character Iris Cory's former (and presumed dead) husband, Elliot Carrington, on the soap opera Texas, a spin-off of Another World, from October 1980 to December 1981. In 1985, he played a renegade soldier in the Season 4 episode, "The Doctor is Out", of the television series The A-Team.

Davis played his most famous character, Niles the Butler, on the television series The Nanny throughout its run from 1993 to 1999 and in its reunion special in 2004 (in cameo flashbacks only). Niles was known for his frequent use of deadpan one-liners, usually insulting character C. C. Babcock, with whom Niles eventually fell in love and married in the series' last season.

His natural accent is Southern American; however, his English accent as Niles was so accurate that many viewers thought he was actually English. He also used an English accent as Professor Moriarty in the Star Trek: The Next Generation episodes "Elementary, Dear Data" and "Ship in a Bottle". However, as the commanding officer of the aircraft carrier USS Enterprise in the 1990 film The Hunt for Red October, Davis spoke with his own American accent. Davis' cartoon voice for the charter Longhair, from the Longhair and Doubledome cartoon shorts from Cartoon Network's Big Pick in 2000, was also English.

In 2002, Davis guest-starred on the television series Frasier, playing Dr. Shafer in Season 10, Episode 8, "Rooms with a View".

Davis was among the group of celebrities lip-synching to the Bee Gees' Stayin' Alive on the "Idol Gives Back" episode of American Idol on April 25, 2007. He appeared briefly in the 2006 film The Prestige, directed by Christopher Nolan.

In 2008 he guest-starred on the television series Ugly Betty.

In December 2010, he appeared on The Fran Drescher Show through Skype.  In 2012, he recorded the audiobook of the Star Wars novel Star Wars: Darth Plagueis, by James Luceno.

Davis will reprise the role of Professor Moriarty in the third and final season of Star Trek: Picard.

Theatre 
Davis is an established theatre actor. He has appeared in both Broadway and off-Broadway productions in New York, and has appeared at the Guthrie Theater in Minneapolis, Minnesota.

Hs first Broadway role was as Antonio Salieri in Amadeus in 1980.

Off-Broadway, he played Rubin in Lake No Bottom in 1990, the Duke of Buckingham in The Tragedy of Richard III, and he starred as Gaev in The Cherry Orchard in 2011.

In 2000, Davis was nominated for a Best Featured Actor Tony Award for his role in David Hirson's Broadway play Wrong Mountain. He played Oscar Wilde in The Invention of Love in 2001. In 2003, he appeared in the Alan Bennett play Talking Heads. In 2004, he portrayed George Bernard Shaw in the Stephen Sondheim musical The Frogs. He co-starred in La Cage Aux Folles with Gary Beach from November 2004 to March 2005. (Reportedly, he clashed frequently with Beach and others. He was eventually replaced by Robert Goulet.)

In 2007, Davis was a member of the cast of an audio production of the play Blue/Orange, in which he took the part of Dr. Robert Smith.

In July 2008, he portrayed King Lear at the Shakespeare Theatre of New Jersey, under the direction of Bonnie J. Monte.

In November 2010, Davis was part of the Celebrity Autobiography series at the Long Center for the Performing Arts in Austin, Texas. He performed along with fellow Nanny alum Lauren Lane and Ugly Betty alum Michael Urie.

In 2012, he played Prospero in The Tempest at Hartford Stage.

In 2015, Davis starred in a one-off performance  in A. R. Gurney's Love Letters (play) opposite Lauren Lane with proceeds going to the Texas State BFA Acting Program. 

In 2016, he appeared on Broadway as Selsdon Mowbray in the Roundabout Theatre revival of Noises Off at the American Airlines Theatre.

Filmography
Film

TV

References

External links
 
 

1945 births
American male film actors
American male musical theatre actors
American male stage actors
American male television actors
Male actors from Arkansas
Living people
People from Clark County, Arkansas
20th-century American male actors
21st-century American male actors
Hall High School (Arkansas) alumni